Roberta Hoskie is an American real estate broker, Author of the book “Poverty Curse Broken” and media personality based in New Haven. She is the president and CEO of Outreach Realty Servicing, Outreach School of Real Estate and 1000 Black Families National Homeownership Program. She is also the founder and Chieftain of the International Millionaire Mindset Sisterhood.

Early life and education 
Hoskie was born and raised in New Haven. When she was 8 years old her parents divorced. She and her three siblings stayed with her mother. Her family had financial problems. When she was 17, she got pregnant, living on a monthly welfare.

After obtaining her associate degree in office administration at Gateway Community and Technical College. She worked at Yale University after obtaining an internship in the Department of Pediatrics.  In 2002, she left Yale University and accepted a position in Bronx, NY as a departmental administrator at Albert Einstein College of Medicine.  She later studied business management at Quinnipiac University.

Career 
Hoskie took an internship at Yale University when she was 20 and several months later bought a home through Yale’s home buying program. She bought a four-family home and rented out some space in it. Four years later, the house’s price quadrupled and she sold the house. She bought a new house in 2004 and opened Outreach Property Management.

In 2006, she founded Outreach Foundation a non-profit organization to help in providing affordable housing for low and moderate income families. Through Outreach Foundation, she coordinates the H.O.P.E. Community Festival & Housing Summit.

In August 2011, Hoskie established Outreach Realty Servicing a full service real estate brokerage and also established Outreach Realty School, a real estate school. In 2015, she launched Ms. Millionaire Mindset Academy and Training Seminars.

Hoskie sits on the Minority Business Initiative for the State of Connecticut, Greater New Haven Chamber of Commerce and Gateway Community College Foundation Board; previously appointed to the Re-Open CT Business Advisory committee, the Board of Directors of Goodwill Easter Seals, Community Action Agency and  held the position as the Chairwomen of Economic Development for the New Haven branch of the NAACP board the New Haven branch of the NAACP board. She is a co-host of WYBC’s, 94.3FM talk show, titled Electric Drum Round Table. In 2015, she launched a reality TV show called ‘CT Money Makers’. The program revolves around the process of real estate investment.

Personal life 
Spouse: Christopher Watts (m. 2015 div. 2021)

Hoskie currently lives with her three children in New Haven.

Awards and honors 
2015 - New Haven Register's Person of the Year
2012 - Business New Haven’s Business New Haven’s Minority Business of the Year
2009 - Awarded Business New Haven’s Rising Star Award

References

Living people
American media personalities
American real estate brokers
American women chief executives
Businesspeople from New Haven, Connecticut
Quinnipiac University alumni
Year of birth missing (living people)
21st-century American women